Robert Nieuwenhuys (30 June 1908 – 8 November 1999) was a Dutch writer of Indo descent. The son of a 'Totok' Dutchman and an Indo-European mother, he and his younger brother Roelof, grew up in Batavia, where his father was the managing director of the renowned Hotel des Indes.

His Indies childhood profoundly influenced his life and work. His Javanese nanny 'nènèk' (English: grandma) Tidjah and particularly his Eurasian mother created the benchmarks of his childhood environment. In his award winning book Oost-Indische spiegel, he states: "If I write about my childhood, I write about her world." and "My Indies youth was critical to my receptiveness to particular cultural patterns. It ingrained a relationship with Indonesia that is irreplaceable."

Nieuwenhuys is the Nestor of Dutch Indies literature.

Life
Nieuwenhuys was born in Semarang, Dutch East Indies. In 1927 he (and his brother) moved to the Netherlands and enrolled in the University of Leiden, but he abhorred academic life and never completed his study at the Faculty of Arts. He did however become acquainted with Indonesian nationalists studying in the Netherlands and adopted anti-colonial convictions.

In 1935 he returned to the Dutch East Indies and befriended his mentor, the iconic Indo writer E. du Perron. Perron influenced him to study the literary work of P.A. Daum and upcoming writer Beb Vuyk. He joined anti-colonial magazines as a writer, researcher and critic.

In 1941 he was a conscript medic in the KNIL and from 1942 to 1945 a Japanese POW. In the Japanese concentration camp Tjimahi he was part of a small group of intellectuals, including Leo Vroman and the iconic Tjalie Robinson, that for a while was able to print a camp periodical named 'Kampkroniek' (Camp Chronicles) and a pamphlet named 'Onschendbaar Domein' (Inviolable Domain).

From 1945–1947 he stayed in the Netherlands to recuperate from the war and evaded the violence of the Bersiap period.

In 1947 he returned to his land of birth during the continuing Indonesian revolution and set up a cultural and literary magazine in an attempt to mitigate the Dutch-Indonesian alienation via art and literature. Although Indonesian intellectuals and artists were receptive to this unique forum political developments and strong anti-Dutch sentiments surpassed all good intentions. In 1952, 4 years into Indonesian independence, Nieuwenhuys repatriated to the Netherlands.

In the Netherlands Nieuwenhuys became a teacher and pursued a literary career. He became a highly influential literary scholar and author and won numerous awards throughout his career, among them the 1983 Constantijn Huygens Prize. He died in Amsterdam.

Nieuwenhuys' magnum opus is the authoritative literary classic Mirror of the Indies: A History of Dutch Colonial Literature (Original Dutch: Oost-Indische spiegel), the main reference book regarding Dutch Indies literature

Prizes
 1738 – 'Essay prize Amsterdam' for De zaak Lebak na honderd jaar
 1973 – 'Special prize Jan Campert foundation' 4 Oost-Indische spiegel
 1975 – 'Dr. Wijnaendts Francken prize' for Oost-Indische spiegel
 1983 – 'Constantijn Huygens prize' for complete wok
 1984 – #honorary doctorate of Leiden University

Publications
 1932 – Een vergeten romantikus
 1954 – Vergeelde portretten uit een Indisch familiealbum
 1959 – Tussen twee vaderlanden
 1961 – Tempo Doeloe, fotografische documenten uit het oude Indië, 1870–1914 (Alias: E. Breton de Nijs)
 1962 –  De pen in gal gedoopt; een keuze uit brieven en documenten van Herman Neubronner van der Tuuk.
 1964 – De dominee en zijn worgengel, van en over François Haverschmidt
 1966 – De onuitputtelijke natuur
 1972 – Oost-Indische spiegel
'Mirror of the Indies: A History of Dutch Colonial Literature' translated from Dutch by E. M. Beekman (Publisher: Periplus, 1999)  Book review.
 1976 – Batavia, koningin van het Oosten
 1979 – Een beetje oorlog
 1981 – Baren en oudgasten, dl. I, fotografische documenten uit het oude Indië, 1870–1920
 1982 – Komen en blijven
 1987 – De mythe van Lebak
 1988 – Met vreemde ogen
 1990 – Oost-Indisch magazijn. De geschiedenis van de Indisch-Nederlandse letterkunde
 1995 – De bevrijding in de Oost
 1998 – Baren en oudgasten: Tempo doeloe, een verzonken wereld
 1998 – Komen en blijven: Tempo doeloe, een verzonken wereld
 1998 – Met vreemde ogen: Tempo doeloe, een verzonken wereld

See also

Other Indo authors
Louis Couperus (1863–1923)
Victor Ido (1869–1948)
Ernest Douwes Dekker (1879–1950)
Maria Dermoût (1888–1962)
Edgar du Perron (1899–1940)
Beb Vuyk (1905–1991)
Tjalie Robinson (1911–1974)
Ernst Jansz (1948– )
Marion Bloem (1952– )

References

Bibliography
Nieuwenhuys, Rob Mirror of the Indies: A History of Dutch Colonial Literature translated from Dutch by E. M. Beekman (Publisher: Periplus, 1999)

Notes and citations

External links
 Profile at the Digital library for Dutch literature
  Profile at the Institute of Netherlands History (ING).

1908 births
1999 deaths
20th-century Dutch novelists
20th-century Dutch male writers
21st-century Dutch novelists
Constantijn Huygens Prize winners
Indo people
People from Semarang
People from Batavia, Dutch East Indies
Dutch male novelists
21st-century Dutch male writers